Colin von Ettingshausen (born 11 August 1971, in Düsseldorf) is a German rower. Von Ettingshausen studied at Keble College, Oxford.

References

External links
 
 

1971 births
Living people
Sportspeople from Düsseldorf
Rowers at the 1992 Summer Olympics
Rowers at the 1996 Summer Olympics
Olympic silver medalists for Germany
Olympic rowers of Germany
Olympic medalists in rowing
German male rowers
Alumni of Keble College, Oxford
World Rowing Championships medalists for Germany
Medalists at the 1992 Summer Olympics
BASF people
20th-century German people
21st-century German people